LOM Ediciones («Lom», means in yaghan language: «sun») is a Chilean press based in Santiago. It was established in 1990.   Several Chileans and Latin American writers published in this press, like Pedro Lemebel, Tomas Moulian and Enrique Lihn.

External links

References

Book publishing companies of Chile
Book publishing companies based in Santiago
Publishing companies established in 1990
Chilean companies established in 1990